The 2017 NATC trials season was the 44th season. It consisted of eight trials events in three main classes: Pro, Expert and Women's Pro. It began on 2 April, with round one in Texas and ended with round eight in Rhode Island on 25 June.

Season summary
Patrick Smage would claim his ninth NATC Trials Championship in 2017.

2017 NATC trials season calendar

Scoring system
Points were awarded to the top twenty finishers in each class. All eight rounds counted for the Pro class, and the best of seven in Expert and Women's Pro classes were counted.

NATC Pro final standings

{|
|

NATC Expert final standings

{|
|

NATC Women's Pro final standings

{|
|

References

Motorcycle trials
2017 in motorcycle sport